Forficula vicaria is a species of earwigs in the family Forficulidae.

Forficulidae